Itoi may refer to:

People
Shigesato Itoi, Japanese author and game designer
Yoshio Itoi, Japanese professional baseball player
Hajime Itoi, Japanese backstroke swimmer

Places
Itoi Station, a railway station on the Muroran Main Line in Tomakomai, Hokkaidō, Japan
Izushi-Itoi Prefectural Natural Park, is a Prefectural Natural Park in northeast Hyōgo Prefecture, Japan
Itoi (Hitui), a village in India

See also
I'itoi, the cosmology of the O'odham peoples

Japanese-language surnames